Fresnoy-en-Gohelle is a commune in the Pas-de-Calais department in the Hauts-de-France region of France.

Geography

Population

Places of interest
 The church of St. Armand, rebuilt as was the rest of the village, after World War I.

World War I
Fresnoy was virtually destroyed in 1917 during the First World War.

After their successes in the spring campaigns (including the taking of Vimy Ridge), the Canadians and British pushed eastwards across open country until they reached German defence lines that, in this sector, ran north to south from Arleux, on to Oppy and then down to Gavrelle.

Following a successful push by the Canadians through Arelux in late April, German positions in and around Fresnoy became the scene of fierce fighting on April 28, 1917. Ernst Jünger, who wrote Storm of Steel, recalled the barrage on the village:

‘Fresnoy was one towering fountain of earth after another. Each second seemed to outdo the last. As if by some magical power, one house subsided into the earth; walls broke, gables fell, and bare sets of beams and joints were sent flying through the air, cutting down the roofs of other houses. Clouds of splinters danced over whitish wraiths of steam. Eyes and ears were utterly compelled by this devastation.’

A few weeks later, on May 5, the Canadians managed to capture the village. It was lost, however, when ferocious German counterattacks were launched on May 7 and pushed the Canadians and British back. The frontline then stabilised just outside the village.

In commemoration of this battle, Fresnoy Mountain in the Canadian Rockies was given its name in 1919.

See also
Communes of the Pas-de-Calais department

References

Sources
Bilton, D, Oppy Wood, Pen and Sword Military, 2005
Nichols, J, Cheerful Sacrifice: The Battle of Arras 1917, Pen and Sword Military, 2003
Jünger, E, Storm of Steel, Penguin, 2003

External links

Finding Private Adams, a soldier who fought near Fresnoy
The Battle of Fresnoy

Fresnoyengohelle